Thailand competed at the 1988 Summer Olympics in Seoul, South Korea. For the first time, a beauty queen accompanied the Thai athletes to march the Olympic Stadium in the person of Pornthip Nakhirunkanok, Miss Universe 1988, during the opening ceremonies.

Competitors
The following is the list of number of competitors in the Games.

Medalists

Results by event

Athletics

Men

Boxing

Sailing

Men

Shooting

Men

Women

References

Official Olympic Reports
International Olympic Committee results database

Nations at the 1988 Summer Olympics
1988
1988 in Thai sport